The tART Collective was an intersectional feminist and anti-racist art collective in New York City. Founded in 2004 and was running until January 2020 when the group announced its decision to end tART Collective, the group was the longest-running feminist art collective in the city. This group was created to help show support towards feminist content artists. During the years that tART was active, membership rose to two dozen members locally and internationally, and the collective served as a post-graduate plan for artists.

Feminist Art Group 
The idea behind tART Collective was running a support group for artists who contribute to bring awareness of feminist and anti-racist ideas through the work of art. tART Collective contributed to different exhibits and events to reach their goal. Members of tART Collective held personal studio visits for all the other members and used this opportunity to get reliable feedback from other artists. There are artists, that contributed towards this group, whose art work still revolves around these ideas.

Exhibits 
tART Collective held many art exhibits in the past and had become an official source to show feminist work of art. tART Collective started a project to exhibit art works from members in a project called "Collectively Assembled: 28 Visits, One Show." During this project, artists were encouraged to attend studio visits in which these artists are able to select a work from the studio visit and select their own piece that they believe responded to the selected work from the studio visit. After doing studio visits, members of tART Collective then interpreted what the artist felt and responded to the other member's work.

In 2005, tART organized the first exhibition of the group's artists' work titled "Fed Up With Being Sweet" in a Bowery loft space. In 2016, tART completed a collaboration with Smoke School of Art (SSA) in Atlanta, GA, at WonderRoot, "A Bad Question", an exhibition and forum on race and feminism. This exhibit that was presented in Atlanta was inspired by the article, "How Can White Women Include Women of Color In Feminism?" Is A Bad Question. Here's Why," where members of tART Collective included pieces that helped dismantle white supremacy. In a Burnaway review, Catherine Rush wrote: “'A Bad Question' prioritizes conversations about race and gender in artworks that reference broken and unexamined dominant social systems, their disastrous effects on individual and communal psyches, and the existence and evolution of different voices and modes of being...Not all artists included in this exhibition necessarily consider their work “feminist,” yet the shared goal of tART and SSA to provide support for women artists is an unequivocally feminist objective."

Other events 
tART exhibited in NYC, Atlanta, and Prague and combined exhibitions with both actions and public programming. tART artists presented on female artist collectives and feminism at Open Engagement, organized a reading and discussion of the Immigrant Manifesto and collaborated with Create Collective at the Center for Anti-Violence Education on a multi-arts workshop in response to a homophobic rise in street harassment in Brooklyn's Park Slope.

Artists
Artists who contributed to the collective throughout the years:
 
 Damali Abrams
 Liz Ainslie
 Keliy Anderson-Staley
 Jill Auckenthaler
 Julia Whitney Barnes
 Suzanne Bennett
 Suzanne Broughel
 Monica Carrier
 Sophia Chai
 Sydney Chastain-Chapman
 Laurie Close
 Aisha Cousins
 Melissa Cowper-Smith
 Ann deVere
 Maria Dumlao
 Purdy Eaton]
 Laura Fayer]
 MaDora Frey
 Georgia Elrod
 Tara Giannini
 Rachael Gorchov
 Clarity Haynes
 Jodie Vincenta Jacobson
 Anna Lise Jensen
 Paddy Johnson
 Elsie Kagan
 Elaine Kaufmann
 Katherine Keltner
 Katy Krantz
 Emily Noelle Lambert
 Katerina Lanfranco
 Rebecca Layton
 Lisa Lindgren
 Rebecca Loyche
 Jodie Lyn-Kee-Chow
 Sandra Mack-Valencia
 Suzanne Malitz
 Glendalys Medina
 Jessica Mein
 Ilse Murdock
 Danielle Mysliwiec
 Katherine Newbegin
 Deborah Pohl
 Anne Polashenski
 Asya Reznikov
 Carrie Rubinstein
 Nikki Schiro
 Amy Shapiro
 Yasmin Spiro
 Melissa Staiger
 Rosemary Taylor
 Petra Gupta Valentova
 Kathleen Vance and Sam Vernon

References

External links

American artist groups and collectives
Feminist artists
Feminist collectives
American contemporary artists
Hunter College alumni
Organizations based in New York City
Artists from New York City
American women artists
2005 establishments in New York City
Feminist organizations in the United States
Women in New York City